Lauta parva is a species of sea snail, a marine gastropod mollusk in the family Muricidae, the murex snails or rock snails.

Description

Distribution

References

 Houart, R.: Zuccon, D. & Puillandre, N. (2019). Description of new genera and new species of Ergalataxinae (Gastropoda: Muricidae). Novapex. 20 (Hors série 12): 1–52.

External links
 Reeve, L. A. (1846). Monograph of the genus Ricinula. In: Conchologia Iconica, or, illustrations of the shells of molluscous animals, vol. 3, pl. 1–6 and unpaginated text. L. Reeve & Co., London

parva
Gastropods described in 1846